Energy was a Taiwanese boy band formed in 2002. The original band consisted of five members, Milk, Ady, Toro, Penny and Joe. Toro and Milk left the band in 2003 and 2005 respectively. Xiao Gang joined the band in mid-2007. The band disbanded in 2009.

History

Early years
Five-member Energy debuted with a Rapcore sound uncommon to the Taiwanese Mandopop scene. The band's up-tempo tracks such as "Let Go" were accompanied by dance choreography comparable to that of Korean boy bands. Energy also performed ballads such as "Love Me for Another Day" and "One Day". The band's popularity grew at a time where several other highly successful Taiwanese boy bands such as 5566 and K One emerged.

Energy's first studio album Energy! Come On! was released within the same year of the band's formation. The cover of Korean boy band Shinhwa's "Come On"  received huge publicity in Taiwanese pop culture due to its catchy hook. The album featured mostly up-tempo tracks, but also contained ballads such as "Loving You the Second Time" and "Never Say Goodbye".

Energy's second album Invincible featured the title track "Invincible", which much like "Come On", was also a cover of a Korean song, this time being jtL's "Enter The Dragon". The single "Love Me for Another Day" remains as the most well received track throughout the band's history. "Boom" was used in a Converse commercial, the track being a cover of metal band Saliva's song of the same name. "Ra-Men Song" was used in an instant noodles commercial, the track featuring Singapore's Terry Lee rapping alongside Energy in English. Ady suffered serious injuries during the filming of a music video for this album and had to give their Asian tour a miss.

Energy's third and final album as a five-member band E3 contained the single "Capturing Evil", a song used to promote an online computer game. Toro left the band not long after the album was released and became part of a new Mandopop trio "Typhoon". Typhoon has only one album to date, titled Overflow.

Four members
Four-member Energy released a Greatest Hits Collection Energy 4 Ever containing four new tracks and two mash-ups of their previous singles. A Limited Edition release of this album included a VCD promoting Michael's Dance, a television drama serial that the band was shooting at that time. Touring by the band proved to be "tough" as Toro's lines had to be covered by the remaining members. Energy expressed during promotional events that they were optimistic, even joking about Toro's departure.

In 2004, Energy starred in the Taiwanese idol drama serial "Michael's Dance". The show's soundtrack contained songs recorded by Energy, including "Hey You", "I Hear the Angels Sing" and "Dark Times". "Let's Go" features Taiwanese singer Show Lo, a personal friend of the band. Penny recorded a solo track for the show titled It Isn't Raining. Although the song was not included on the soundtrack or any other album, Penny performed it during Energy's FINAL FANTASY concert.

The 2005 album FINAL FANTASY was the final album of four-member Energy. The singles "Heaven and Earth" and "Taste of Tears" were released to moderate success. The album was criticised for containing an excess of freestyle battle and phony sentimentality. The music video for Heaven and Earth depicted Ady trapped in a castle and the other three members saving him, seemingly hinting that Ady was leaving the band much like Only Me and Toro's departure. A documentary of the fans' efforts to stop the band from disbanding was released in the second edition of "FINAL FANTASY".

After a series of FINAL FANTASY concerts, Milk turned to his solo career of hosting, advertising, and recording an EP titled "Puppet", released in 2006. Milk released a solo album in 2008. Energy attended several award ceremonies without Milk, performing their creatively written ballad "We" as a three-member band.

2006 to Present
After a year of inactivity, three-member Energy released an album New Generation in 2006, featuring a rock influenced sound and a new band logo. The music video of title track "New Generation" depicted the band dancing with extended arms, matching the album's ape-man theme. Penny wrote the lyrics for power ballad "Love Went Out of Control", although its tune was a cover of "One" by Korean boy band TVXQ. "Quick Kill" was written by Taiwanese rock band Mayday  such as Ashin, Stone and Monster from B'in Music, who also sings and appears in the music video. "Defeat" was written by Taiwanese singer Chou Chuan-huing, who also sings on the track. China's release of the album had two tracks removed due to "inappropriate content", one of which being Quick Kill. The band expressed that it was a "pity that the China audience don't get to enjoy the full album".

In 2007, Xiao Gang joined Energy to form a four-member group. Xiao Gang had previously choreographed dance routines for Energy and K ONE, and is Penny's personal friend. Energy described the addition of Xiao Gang as a move to make the band "more complete".

Energy's 2007 album Born To Be Bad received generally positive reviews, mainly praising the band's improved vocals. The title track "Born To Be Bad" received huge radio play and publicity because of its unique mix of hip-hop and rock. Energy's recording company didn't want the band to incorporate a dance routine for this song, but Energy convinced them otherwise. For this dance, Energy created an exercise routine named the "Requires three thousand lives". The lyrics of ballad "Stars" were written by Joe and Ady. Another ballad "Promise Me" had a musical style similar to that of Energy's early years.

Members

Current

Former

Discography
Studio albums
 Energy! Come On! (2002)
  Energy / Unassailable (2003)
 Invulnerable (2003)
 E3 (2003)
 Energy 4 Ever (2004)
 Hey You! (2004)
 Final Fantasy (2005)
 New Generation (2006)
 Born to Be Bad (2007)
 Power Energy (2022)

References

External links
Official Blog
energymusic1012.spaces.live.com

Mandopop musical groups
Taiwanese boy bands
Musical groups established in 2002
2002 establishments in Taiwan